The Army Hall (Bosnian: Dom Armije / Dom Oružanih snaga; Officer Casino, The Military of Federation Home) is a building in Sarajevo that was built in 1881. It was originally a casino for officers, and it was named Dom JNA (Bosnian for “Home of JNA (Yugoslav National Army”) during the existence of Yugoslavia. Today it is a national monument consisting of the casino building with four paintings by Ismet Mujezinović.

References 

Army of the Republic of Bosnia and Herzegovina
Buildings and structures in Sarajevo
1881 establishments
Architecture in Bosnia and Herzegovina
National Monuments of Bosnia and Herzegovina